St. Olav's Cathedral is the cathedral of the Roman Catholic Diocese of Oslo and the parish church of St. Olav's parish in Oslo, Norway. The cathedral has church services and masses in Norwegian and several other languages, including English and Polish.

History
At the time of construction, this church, being built at Hammersborg, near the graveyard of Our Saviour, was located in the countryside outside the then city of Oslo. The work was funded by private donations and fundraising abroad, the most generous individual donor being Queen Josephine, who was a Catholic herself. The first mass of the church was celebrated on 24 August 1856, but as there was no Roman Catholic bishop in the country, the church was not consecrated until 8 August 1896.

A relic, reportedly a bone from St. Olav's arm, have been placed in a showcase since the 1860s. When the Roman Catholic Diocese of Oslo was established in 1953, St. Olav's was chosen as the episcopal seat and was elevated to the rank of cathedral. It is the second Catholic cathedral in Oslo. St. Olav's Cathedral was visited by Pope John Paul II when he visited the Scandinavian countries in 1989.

See also 
List of cathedrals in Norway
List of Roman Catholic parishes in Norway
Roman Catholicism in Norway
St. Hallvard's Cathedral

References

External links 
Katolsk.no website Cathedral 
 Parish blog (in English)
Timetable for Catholic Masses - all languages (in English)

Churches in Oslo
St. Olav's Cathedral in Oslo
Roman Catholic cathedrals in Norway
Olav
Churches completed in 1856
Oslo